Frank Corte Jr. was a Republican member of the Texas House of Representatives from 1993 to 2011. He is a graduate of the Army War College.

References

Republican Party members of the Texas House of Representatives
Year of birth missing (living people)
Living people